Stefan Kölly (14 March 1928 – 22 May 2018) was an Austrian footballer. He played in one match for the Austria national football team in 1952.

References

External links
 

1928 births
2018 deaths
Austrian footballers
Austria international footballers
Place of birth missing
Association footballers not categorized by position